Byon V. K. (born 17 June 1982), professionally credited as Biyn, is an Indian actor who works in Malayalam cinema.

Early life and family
Biyon was born in Kozhikode to Sivasankar VK and Beena K. Byon Completed his schooling at Presentation High School and Hill Top Public School. He completed his Pre-Degree course at St. Joseph's College, Devagiri.

Biyon completed his bachelor's degree and masters in commerce at NSS College, Calicut. He always found time to pursue his passion, acting, even while he was busy with school work. Biyon is also interested in photography. His other hobbies include traveling and trekking to some adventurous places and is very much interested in long drives.

On 20 March 2011, Biyon married Mintu EK.

Film career
Biyon made his debut in 1989 in the film Oru Vadakkan Veeragatha directed by Hariharan as a child artist. Biyon was fortunate enough to start his acting career with one of the most famous film directors in Malayalam, Hariharan in 1989. He has completed over fifty films.

Biyon has also starred in a few English, Tamil, and Kannada films.

Filmography

Malayalam movies

Other languages

Other works
Short film
69 - Oru Thala Thirinja Katha
Serial
Orma(Asianet)
 Reality show
Dance Kerala Dance (Zee Keralam) as mentor

References

External links
 

Indian male film actors
Living people
Male actors from Kozhikode
Male actors in Malayalam cinema
1982 births
20th-century Indian male actors
21st-century Indian male actors
Male actors in Tamil cinema
Male actors in Kannada cinema